Dragon Ball Z: Super Android 13, known in Japan as , is a 1992 Japanese anime science fiction martial arts film and the seventh Dragon Ball Z film. It was originally released in Japan on July 11 at the Toei Anime Fair along with the third Dragon Quest: Dai no Daibōken film and the Rokudenashi Blues film. Early concept art for the reissue used the title Android Assault, but the final product went back to using Funimation's original title for the film.

Plot

The mad scientist Dr. Gero is killed at the hands of his creations, the Androids 17 and 18. However, Gero had secretly copied his consciousness into an underground supercomputer that continued to manifest his dream of creating the ultimate android capable of killing Goku and destroying humanity.

At a shopping mall, Goku, Gohan, Chi-Chi, Krillin, Master Roshi, Oolong, and Future Trunks eat lunch in a restaurant. Two beings enter the city and begin causing mayhem as they hunt for Goku, eventually detecting his location in the restaurant above them. They use a massive energy attack in an attempt to kill Goku but he, Gohan, Krillin, and Trunks manage to survive and save the people inside of the restaurant from certain death. Goku is confronted by the culprits and correctly assumes that they are androids because he cannot sense their energy. Introducing themselves as Androids 14 and 15, they attack and overwhelm Goku before Trunks intervenes. Goku suggests that they take the fight elsewhere in order to avoid harming innocent people in the city, and they fly off as the androids pursue them.

Goku and Trunks engage the androids when another android soon appears - Android 13. He explains that despite Dr. Gero's death, his computer has been programmed to continue the mission to kill Goku out of revenge for defeating the Red Ribbon Army decades prior. 13 quickly overwhelms Goku while Trunks is outmatched by the combined assault of 14 and 15. However, Vegeta also arrives and joins the fight. Goku engages 13 while Trunks and Vegeta fight 14 and 15 respectively. Goku, Vegeta and Trunks all simultaneously power up to their Super Saiyan forms as Gohan and Krillin watch on. 13 manages to hold the upper hand against Goku, who is soon assisted by the arrival of Piccolo, while Trunks and Vegeta destroy 14 and 15. They surround 13 who is pleased that 14 and 15 have been destroyed and he proceeds to absorb their cores into his own being and undergoes a transformation into a hulking form.

With his newfound power, 13 completely overwhelms Goku and his allies. Seeing no other option for victory, Goku begins summoning energy for the Spirit Bomb attack while his allies attempt to hold off 13. 13 eventually realizes what Goku is doing and attempts to stop him, but Piccolo manages to hold him off just long enough for Goku to transform into a Super Saiyan again and he merges with the Spirit Bomb's energy. 13 attacks again, but Goku punches through 13's abdomen and sends him soaring into the core of the Spirit Bomb where he is obliterated by its massive energy. With 13's demise, the underground supercomputer shuts down for good. Krillin and Gohan are hospitalized where the group modestly celebrate their victory together. Elsewhere, Piccolo and Vegeta sit on an iceberg, isolated from the celebration.

Cast

Music
OP (Opening Theme):
"Cha-La Head-Cha-La"
 Lyrics by Yukinojō Mori
 Music by Chiho Kiyooka
 Arranged by Kenji Yamamoto
 Performed by Hironobu Kageyama
ED (Ending Theme):
 
 Lyrics by Dai Satō
 Music by Chiho Kiyooka
 Arranged by Kenji Yamamoto
 Performed by Hironobu Kageyama & Yuka

English dub soundtrack
The score for the Funimation English dub was composed by Mark Menza. The "Double Feature" release contains an alternate audio track containing the English dub with original Japanese background music by Shunsuke Kikuchi, an opening theme of "Cha-La Head-Cha-La", and an ending theme of "At the Brink: The Earth's Limit".

Releases
It was released on DVD and VHS in North America on February 4, 2003. It was later released in Double Feature set along with Bojack Unbound (1993) for Blu-ray and DVD on February 10, 2009, both feature full 1080p format in HD remastered 16:9 aspect ratio and an enhanced 5.1 surround mix. The film was re-released to DVD in remastered thinpak collection on December 6, 2011, containing the second 4 Dragon Ball Z films.

Reception
A third English dub produced and released exclusively in Malaysia by Speedy Video, features an unknown voice cast.

References

External links

 Official anime website of Toei Animation
 
 

1992 films
1992 anime films
Super Android 13!
Funimation
Toei Animation films
Films scored by Shunsuke Kikuchi
Cyborg films